Los Ebanos is a census-designated place (CDP) in Hidalgo County, Texas. The population was 335 at the 2010 United States Census. It is part of the McAllen–Edinburg–Mission Metropolitan Statistical Area. The city is named after the Texas Ebony (Ebenopsis ebano) that anchors the Los Ebanos Ferry.

Geography
Los Ebanos is located at  (26.243665, -98.561039).

Los Ebanos also serves as an official border crossing between the United States and Mexico via the Los Ebanos-Diaz Ordaz Ferry. The hand-operated cable ferry provides transport between Los Ebanos and Gustavo Díaz Ordaz, Tamaulipas.

Demographics
As of the census of 2000, there were 403 people, 135 households, and 100 families residing in the CDP. The population density was 711.9 people per square mile (273.0/km2). There were 168 housing units at an average density of 296.8/sq mi (113.8/km2). The racial makeup of the CDP was 97.02% White, 0.25% African American, 1.99% from other races, and 0.74% from two or more races. Hispanic or Latino of any race were 98.01% of the population.

There were 135 households, out of which 28.9% had children under the age of 18 living with them, 48.9% were married couples living together, 20.7% had a female householder with no husband present, and 25.2% were non-families. 23.7% of all households were made up of individuals, and 13.3% had someone living alone who was 65 years of age or older. The average household size was 2.99 and the average family size was 3.59.

In the CDP, the population was spread out, with 25.6% under the age of 18, 12.9% from 18 to 24, 20.6% from 25 to 44, 20.6% from 45 to 64, and 20.3% who were 65 years of age or older. The median age was 36 years. For every 100 females, there were 73.0 males. For every 100 females age 18 and over, there were 72.4 males.

The median income for a household in the CDP was $7,066, and the median income for a family was $7,692. Males had a median income of $28,750 versus $37,500 for females. The per capita income for the CDP was $6,240. About 64.7% of families and 72.6% of the population were below the poverty line, including 89.7% of those under age 18 and 72.6% of those age 65 or over.

Education
Los Ebanos is served by the La Joya Independent School District. The zoned schools for residents are Sam Fordyce Elementary School, Lorenzo de Zavala Middle School, and La Joya High School.

In addition, South Texas Independent School District operates magnet schools that serve the community.

References

External links
 LOS EBANOS, TEXAS - Home of the last hand-operated ferry on the Rio Grande
 MoMA - Richard Kleinberg Los Ebanos, Texas 1985

Census-designated places in Hidalgo County, Texas
Census-designated places in Texas
Mexico–United States border crossings
Texas populated places on the Rio Grande